Harold Wilson (1916–1995) was Prime Minister of the United Kingdom from 1964 to 1970 and from 1974 to 1976.

Harold Wilson may also refer to:

 Harold A. Wilson (athlete) (1885–1916), British track Olympian, 1500 m silver medalist in 1908
 Harold E. Wilson (1921–1998), U.S. Marine, Medal of Honor recipient
 Harold Wilson (cricketer), New Zealand cricketer
 Hobb Wilson (Harold Wilson), Canadian ice hockey player
 Harold Wilson (rower) (1903–1981), American rower
 Harold A. Wilson (physicist) (1874–1964), English physicist
 Hal Wilson (1861–1933), character actor in silent films
 SS Harold O. Wilson, a Liberty ship

See also
Harry Wilson (disambiguation)
Wilson (surname)